"Lifestyle" is a song by American hip hop group Rich Gang, featuring rappers Young Thug and Rich Homie Quan. The song, produced by London on da Track, was released on June 5, 2014. It has been certified Platinum in the United States.

Background and composition
The song premiered in May 2014 as the lead single for the unreleased mixtape Rich Gang 2.

Critical reception
Pitchfork ranked the song at number 69 on their list of the top 100 songs of 2014. Complex named the song at number 2 on their list of the 50 best songs of 2014. Brooklyn Russell of Pretty Much Amazing described it as "a sort of Millennial version of Generation X’s 'Nuthin' but a 'G' Thang,'" calling it "an all-encompassing generational hip-hop party track." Russell also praised the song's production, adding "Thug comes through over a breezy instrumental and casually gives us the now iconic opening line: 'I did a lot of shit just to live this here lifestyle."''

Music video
A music video for "Lifestyle", directed by Be El Be, was released on June 29, 2014. The video features Birdman, Young Thug, Rich Homie Quan, and others partying with women on a plane and yacht. Mack Maine, Soulja Boy, and the song's producer London on da Track make cameo appearances.

Remixes
In August 2014, American rapper Lil Boosie released his remix of "Lifestyle". On September 29, shortly after being signed to Rich Gang/Cash Money Records, Atlanta-based singer Jacquees released a video to his remix of "Lifestyle". Another remix of the song by Atlanta-based rapper Waka Flocka Flame was released in October 2014.

Live performances
Young Thug and Rich Homie Quan performed the song at the 2014 BET Hip Hop Awards on October 14, 2014.

Charts

Weekly charts

Year-end charts

Certifications

Release history

References

External links

2014 singles
2014 songs
Rich Homie Quan songs
Young Thug songs
Cash Money Records singles
Republic Records singles
Songs written by Young Thug
Songs written by London on da Track
Song recordings produced by London on da Track